St. George is a town in Knox County, Maine, United States. It includes the villages of Port Clyde and Tenants Harbor, with the latter being town's commercial center. A favorite with artists, writers and naturalists, St. George is home to the Brothers and Hay Ledge nature preserve, comprising four islands off Port Clyde. The town's population stands at 2,594 residents, according to the 2020 Census.

History

The peninsula and its islands were noted for immense flocks of duck, geese and other waterfowl. Although the region was part of the Waldo Patent, General Samuel Waldo complied with requests from Abenaki Indians not to settle immigrants at what was their prized hunting ground. Consequently, the peninsula remained unpopulated until after the close of the French and Indian Wars in 1763. The Revolutionary War further slowed development, but during the 1780s, there was rapid settlement of the peninsula. It was incorporated in 1789 as part of Cushing. On February 7, 1803, the peninsula and its islands were set off and incorporated as St. George, taking its name from the river.

Farmers grew potatoes. After 1830, granite was quarried and shipped nationally for construction. Shipbuilders annually produced three to four vessels, many for the coasting trade, exporting cordwood, lumber and fish. Factories canned lobsters, clams and sardines. In the 1880s, the town's rugged oceanfront beauty was discovered by "rusticators"—visitors, including artists, who bought or built summer cottages.

At the town office, there is a statue of Saint George, the town's namesake, fighting the legendary dragon.

Geography

Bounded on the west by the Saint George River, the town is located on a peninsula extending into the Gulf of Maine.

St. George is crossed by state route 131. It borders the town of South Thomaston to the north.

Both Allen Island and Mosquito Island House are listed on the National Register of Historic Places for St. George.

Demographics

2010 census

As of the census of 2010, there were 2,591 people, 1,204 households, and 768 families residing in the town. The racial makeup of the town was 98.8% White, 0.2% African American, 0.1% Asian, and 0.8% from two or more races. Hispanic or Latino of any race were 0.5% of the population.

There were 1,204 households, of which 21.0% had children under the age of 18 living with them, 51.9% were married couples living together, 6.6% had a female householder with no husband present, 5.3% had a male householder with no wife present, and 36.2% were non-families. 29.7% of all households were made up of individuals, and 14.3% had someone living alone who was 65 years of age or older. The average household size was 2.15 and the average family size was 2.60.

The median age in the town was 51.7 years. 17.3% of residents were under the age of 18; 4.6% were between the ages of 18 and 24; 17.8% were from 25 to 44; 35.4% were from 45 to 64; and 24.9% were 65 years of age or older. The gender makeup of the town was 48.6% male and 51.4% female.

2000 census

As of the census of 2000, there were 2,580 people, 1,119 households, and 757 families residing in the town. The racial makeup of the town was 98.68% White, 0.16% African American, 0.23% Native American, 0.35% Asian, 0.04% from other races, and 0.54% from two or more races. Hispanic or Latino of any race were 0.23% of the population.

There were 1,119 households, out of which 28.2% had children under the age of 18 living with them, 57.8% were married couples living together, 7.0% had a female householder with no husband present, and 32.3% were non-families. 26.5% of all households were made up of individuals, and 12.4% had someone living alone who was 65 years of age or older. The average household size was 2.31 and the average family size was 2.77.

In the town, the population was spread out, with 22.1% under the age of 18, 4.3% from 18 to 24, 24.5% from 25 to 44, 28.2% from 45 to 64, and 21.0% who were 65 years of age or older. The median age was 44 years. For every 100 females, there were 96.5 males. For every 100 females age 18 and over, there were 93.7 males.

The median income for a household in the town was $41,211, and the median income for a family was $48,162. Males had a median income of $33,929 versus $25,439 for females. The per capita income for the town was $23,272. About 3.8% of families and 8.6% of the population were below the poverty line, including 11.7% of those under age 18 and 7.7% of those age 65 or over.

Education 

According to Roy Meservey, the first school in St. George served the children of Samuel Watts in the 1780s. In 1792, four school districts were laid out, and more were created as the town's population grew. At peak in the late 1800s, there were 18 or 20 schools in St. George. As the population decreased, most of the districts were consolidated, and by the 1950s, only four remained: St. George, Clark's Island, Port Clyde, and Tenants Harbor. In 1957, despite strong public opposition, the St. George, Clark's Island, and Port Clyde schools were all closed. Only Tenants Harbor remained, which all students since have attended under the unified name 'St. George School.' St. George School is a public K–8 school operated by the St. George Municipal School Unit, and has 180 students.

St. George High School was established in 1894 in the sail loft over Long's Store. Its building was erected in 1900, graduating its first class in 1901. It, too, closed as a result of population decline, graduating its last class in 1962. For the 1962–1963 academic year, high school students attended Georges Valley High School in Thomaston. The old building was used as the new elementary school, before being demolished a few years later and replaced by the current town office and fire station.

Starting in the 2015–2015 academic year, St. George students in grades 9–12 began attending one of five schools of their choice:
 Camden Hills Regional High School
 Lincoln Academy
 Medomak Valley High School
 Oceanside High School
 Watershed School

Places of worship 

 First Baptist Church of St. George Maine

Notable people 

 Linda Bean, businessperson, granddaughter of Leon Leonwood Bean and an heiress to the L.L.Bean company
 Albert S. Bickmore, naturalist and the principal founder of the American Museum of Natural History
 Richard Falley Jr. (1740–1808), an ensign at the Battle of Bunker Hill and armorer during the American Revolutionary War
 John G. Roberts, Chief Justice of the US Supreme Court; owned a vacation home on Hupper Island off the village of Port Clyde in St. George
 Charles Wilbert Snow, 60th governor of Connecticut; born on White Head Island on Penobscot Bay
 Andrew Wyeth, one of the best-known U.S. artists of the middle 20th century, owned Southern Island and Tenants Harbor Light
 Jamie Wyeth, contemporary American realist painter, son of Andrew Wyeth; owns Southern Island and Tenants Harbor Light, sold to him by his father

Sites of interest

 Marshall Point Light
 Marshall Point Lighthouse Museum – St. George Historical Society
 Tenants Harbor Light
 Whitehead Light

References

 History of St. George, Maine (1886)
 A. J. Coolidge & J. B. Mansfield, A History and Description of New England; Boston, Massachusetts 1859

External links
 Town of St. George, Maine
 Jackson Memorial Library
 Maine.gov – St. George, Maine
 Maine Genealogy: St. George, Knox County, Maine

Towns in Knox County, Maine
Towns in Maine